Arinzé Mokwe Kene  is a Nigerian-born British actor and playwright.

Early life 
In 1987, Kene was born in Lagos, Nigeria and moved to London when he was four. Kene's father was a taxi driver. Kene was bullied growing up and was encouraged to take kickboxing lessons. When he turned 16, he started his amateur kickboxing career and went on to win two national championships. He quit kickboxing at 21 years old and went on to pursue an acting career.

Career
Kene has appeared in stage productions such as playing Simba in The Lion King, Daddy Cool, and in June 2009 played strutting lothario Raymond LeGrendre in the musical Been So Long, based on Ché Walker's 1998 play, which opened at the Young Vic. Kene also plays the lead in 2010 UK Film Council feature Freestyle. In 2010, he joined the cast of the BBC's EastEnders as Connor Stanley, for which he was nominated for Best Newcomer at the 2011 All About Soap Bubble Awards. His play Suffocation opened at the Oval House Theatre in London in 2011. Kene was also a member of the series 3 writing team for EastEnders: E20. In April 2011, his casting as Rocco in Hollyoaks was announced.

In 2013, Kene's play God's Property was a Talawa Theatre Company, Soho Theatre and Albany Theatre co-production, directed by Michael Buffong.

In 2016 he portrayed Tyler in the television series Crazyhead. From 6 October to 3 December 2016 Kene acted and sang in the role of Sam Cooke in the Donmar Warehouse production of the European premiere of One Night in Miami, a play by Kemp Powers. He also appeared opposite Beanie Feldstein and Alfie Allen in How to Build a Girl, directed by Coky Giedroyc.

In 2018, Arinzé starred in Misty, which in September transferred to Trafalgar Studios, following a sold-out run at the Bush Theatre earlier in the year. The play was written by Kene, directed by Omar Elerian and produced by Trafalgar Entertainment Group.

On 17 February 2020, it was announced that Arinzé Kene would play the role of Bob Marley in the new musical Get Up, Stand Up!, opening at the Lyric Theatre in February 2021 in London's West End, before being postponed to October 2021 due to the COVID-19 pandemic. In 2022, he received an Olivier Award nomination for Best Actor in a Musical for his performance.

Kene was appointed Member of the Order of the British Empire (MBE) in the 2020 Birthday Honours for services to drama and screenwriting.

Filmography

Awards and nominations

Major associations

Other awards

References

External links

Black British male actors
British male television actors
Male actors from London
Living people
English people of Nigerian descent
1987 births
Male actors from Lagos
Members of the Order of the British Empire
Nigerian emigrants to the United Kingdom